There are separate lists of members of the European Parliament for the United Kingdom for each term:

Delegation (1973)
1st term (1979)
2nd term (1984)
3rd term (1989)
4th term (1994)
5th term (1999)
6th term (2004)
7th term (2009)
8th term (2014)
9th term (2019)

There is also a list of female members of the European Parliament for the United Kingdom.